ITU G.992.4 is a standard for splitterless ADSL2 with data rate mandatory capability reduced to 1.536 Mbit/s downstream and 512 kbit/s upstream.  It is also referred to as G.lite.bis.

See also
 ADSL
 ADSL2+
 List of interface bit rates

References

External links
 ITU-T Recommendation G.992.4 : Splitterless asymmetric digital subscriber line transceivers 2 (splitterless ADSL2)

Digital subscriber line
ITU-T G Series Recommendations
ITU-T recommendations
Telecommunications-related introductions in 2002